Almost an Island is the seventh album by Scottish Celtic rock group Wolfstone, released in 2002. It was their first studio album to be released on their own label, Once Bitten Records.

Track listing
 "The Piper and the Shrew" (Leo McCann) – 3:32
 "Elav the Terrible" (R.S. McDonald) – 3:27
 "Where the Summers Go" (Duncan Chisholm/Stuart Eaglesham) – 4:07
 "La Grande Nuit du Port de Peche" (Martin Hughes) – 4:11
 "The Queen of Argyll" – 4:20
The Queen of Argyll (Andy M. Stewart)
The Knockard Elf (Stevie Saint)
 "5/4 Madness" (Phil Cunningham) – 5:01
 "Davie's Last Reel" (Saint) – 3:22
 "Jericho" (Chisholm/Eaglesham) – 4:10
 "All Our Dreams" (Iain MacDonald) – 6:39
 "The Panda" (Gordon Duncan) – 5:14
The Panda
The Soup Dragon

Personnel
Duncan Chisholm – fiddle, backing vocals
Wayne Mackenzie – bass guitar, backing vocals
Stevie Saint – pipes, whistles
Stuart Eaglesham – guitars, vocals
Alyn Cosker – drums
Phil Cunningham – keyboards, accordion, backing vocals
Cous-cous MacAfferty – cittern
Brian McNeill – tambourine

References

2002 albums
Wolfstone albums